Alburnoides varentsovi is a fish species of the family Cyprinidae, known from Turkmenistan. It can be differentiated from its cogenerates by differences in fin ray and vertebral counts, together with other morphological characters.

References

Further reading
Turan, Davut, et al. "Alburnoides manyasensis (Actinopterygii, Cyprinidae), a new species of cyprinid fish from Manyas Lake basin, Turkey." ZooKeys 276 (2013): 85.
Roudbar, Arash Jouladeh, et al. "A molecular approach to the genus Alburnoides using COI sequences data set and the description of a new species, A. damghani, from the Damghan River system (the Dasht-e Kavir Basin, Iran)(Actinopterygii, Cyprinidae)." ZooKeys 579 (2016): 157.

Alburnoides
Endemic fauna of Turkmenistan
Fish of Central Asia
Taxa named by Nina Gidalevna Bogutskaya
Taxa named by Brian W. Coad
Fish described in 2009